Martinius is a genus of minute marsh-loving beetles in the family Limnichidae. There are at least three described species in Martinius.

Species
 Martinius ripisaltator Spilman, 1966
 Martinius tellepontis Spilman, 1959
 Martinius temporalis Wooldridge, 1988

References

Further reading

 
 
 
 
 
 
 
 

Byrrhoidea genera